The first season of Mestre do Sabor premiered on Thursday, October 10, 2019, at 10:30 p.m. / 9:30 p.m. (BRT / AMT) on Rede Globo. The season generally received bad reviews from critics and its ratings were below average Rede Globo's expectations.

On December 26, 2019, Gabriel Coelho from Team Avillez won the competition over Dudu Poerner from Team Leo, and the grand prize of R$250.000 and a brand new car.

Teams
Key
 Winner
 Runner-up
 Eliminated

Blind tests
 Key

Pressure tests

The Duels
 Key

Elimination chart
Key

Week 1: Quarterfinals

Week 2: Semifinals

Week 3: Finals

Ratings and reception

Brazilian ratings
All numbers are in points and provided by Kantar Ibope Media.

References

External links
 Mestre do Sabor on Gshow.com

2019 Brazilian television seasons